Australia competed at the 2012 Summer Paralympics Games in London, United Kingdom, from 29 August to 9 September 2012. The London Games were the biggest Games with 164 nations participating, 19 more than in the 2008 Beijing Paralympic. Australia has participated at every Summer Paralympic Games and hosted the 2000 Sydney Games. As such, the 2000 Sydney Games, regarded as one of the more successful Games, became a point-of-reference and an inspiration in the development of the 2012 London Games.

Australia finished 5th in the final medal count with 85 medals: 32 gold medals, 23 silver medals and 30 bronze medals.

Context 
The 2012 London Paralympic Games were officially opened on Wednesday 29 August by Queen Elizabeth II at The Olympic Stadium in London. The Games had a record number of participating athletes at 4327, made up of 2736 men and 1501 women. London hosted 503 medal-winning events in 20 different sports. The Paralympians competed under six different impairment groups: amputees, blind and visually impaired, cerebral palsied, intellectually disabled, Les Autres and spinal cord injuries. These athletes set 251 new world records and 314 Paralympic Games records.

During the Games, 2.7 million tickets were sold with most events and sessions selling out. Media coverage of the Paralympic Games was high. The Games were shown in more countries than previous Games, attracting the biggest international audience yet.

The Australian team 

The Australian Paralympic Team launch was held at Parliament House, Canberra on 25 June 2012. Prime Minister Julia Gillard and the Leader of the Opposition Tony Abbott farewelled the team. Julia Gillard told the athletes that they were "the fastest, the strongest, the best". Tony Abbott said "you are best of the best. In fact you are better than that because each one of you has mastered a significant disability to be in this team". Gillard stated that the Australian Government has invested A$13 million in team funding during the last year.  The Australian Paralympic Committee organised a Staging Camp in Cardiff, Wales from 1 to 28 August 2012 to allow the Australian team to prepare for the Games.

The 2012 Australian Paralympic team had 161 athletes, 90 men and 71 women, competing in 13 sports. About half the team attended their first Games. Shooter Libby Kosmala, at the age of 70, was Australia's oldest competitor. Swimmer Maddison Elliott, at the age of thirteen, was the youngest.

Jason Hellwig, the Australian Paralympic Committee's chief executive, was the Chef de Mission. While Michael Hartung and Kate McLoughlin were the Deputy Chefs de Mission.

On 21 August 2012, Greg Smith, a wheelchair rugby player and former track and field athlete, was announced as the Australian flag bearer for the London 2012 Summer Paralympics opening ceremony. The announcement was made at a special ceremony for the Australian Paralympic Team in front of Cardiff Castle in Wales.

The Australian Paralympic Committee worked to classify each Australian Paralympian's individual disability well before the London Games. This was to ensure that each Paralympian qualified for their event and to "minimise any effect on [each Paralympian’s] Games preparation”. As such, the number of classifiers in the Australian Paralympic Committee, with the capacity to classify an athlete's impairment group, increased to 176 from 166 during 2011–2012.

2012 Paralympians of the Year Awards 
 Australian Paralympian of the Year: Jacqueline Freney
 APC President's Medal for Excellence in Sportsmanship: Libby Kosmala (shooting)/ Kieran Modra (cycling)
 Male Athlete of the Year: Evan O’Hanlon (athletics)
 Female Athlete of the Year: Jacqueline Freney (swimming)
 Junior Athlete of the Year: Maddison Elliott (swimming)/ Rheed McCracken (athletics)
 Team of the Year: The Steelers (wheelchair rugby)/ SKUD18 crew (sailing)
 Coach of the Year: Peter Day (cycling)
 Paralympic Achievement Award: Matthew Cowdrey (swimming)

Notable Australian performances

Jacqueline Freney 
A cerebral palsy swimmer and the highest achieving individual athlete of the Games, winning eight gold medals. This is the most gold medals won by an Australian athlete at a single Paralympic Games.

- Awards: Australian Paralympian of the Year 2012 and Australian Female Athlete of the Year.

- The most successful individual medallist of any nation in London.

- Ranked equal first on total medals won at a single Paralympic Games with fellow Australian swimmer Matthew Cowdrey and USA swimmer Jessica Long, with eight medals in total.

- Events where Freney won a gold medal:
 100 m backstroke (S7)
 50 m butterfly (S7)
 100 m freestyle (S7)
 50 m freestyle (S7)
 400 m freestyle (S7)
 200 m individual medley (SM7)
 Women's 4x100 m freestyle relay (34 pts) with Ellie Cole, Katherine Downie, Maddison Elliott
 Women's 4x100 m medley relay (34 pts) with Ellie Cole, Katherine Downie, Annabelle Williams

Matthew Cowdrey 

An arm amputee swimmer, winning eight medals – five gold, two silver and one bronze medal. During the Games, he became Australia's greatest Paralympian in terms of gold and total medals. He finished the Games with 13 gold medals.

- Awards: Paralympic Achievement Award

-Events where Cowdrey won a gold medal:
 100 m backstroke (S9)
 50 m freestyle (S9)
 100 m freestyle (S9)
 200 m individual medley (SM9)
 Men's 4x100 m freestyle relay (34 pts) with Michael Anderson, Michael Auprince, Blake Cochrane, Matthew Haanappel Brenden Hall, Matthew Levy, Andrew Pasterfield
- Events where Cowdrey won a silver medal:
 100 m butterfly (S9)
 100 m breaststroke (SB8)
- Events where Cowdrey won a silver medal:
 Men's 4x100 m medley relay (34 pts) with Michael Anderson, Michael Auprince, Matthew Haanappel, Brenden Hall, Matthew Levy, Andrew Pasterfield, Rick Pendleton

Evan O'Hanlon 
A cerebral palsy athletics sprinter, winning two gold medals.

- Awards: Australian Male Athlete of the Year

- Events where O’Hanlon won a gold medal:
 100 m (T38)
 200 m (T38)

Ellie Cole 
A leg amputee swimmer, winning 4 gold medals and 2 bronze medals.

- Events where Cole won a gold medal:
 100 m backstroke  (S9)
 100 m freestyle (S9)
 Women's 4x100 m freestyle relay (34 pts) with Katherine Downie, Maddison Elliott, Jacqueline Freney
 Women's 4x100 m medley relay (34 pts) with Katherine Downie, Jacqueline Freney, Annabelle Williams
- Events where Cole won a bronze medal:
 50 m freestyle (S9)
 400 m freestyle (S9)

Maddison Elliott 

A cerebral palsy swimmer, at the age of thirteen, became Australia's youngest gold medalist and medalist.[2]

- Awards: Australian Junior Athlete of the Year

- Event where Elliott won a gold medal:
 Women's 4x100 m freestyle relay (34 pts) with Ellie Cole, Katherine Downie, Jacqueline Freney
- Event where Elliott won a silver medal:
 50 m freestyle (S8)
- Events where Elliott won a bronze medal:
 100 m freestyle (S8)
 400 m freestyle (S8)

Australian wheelchair rugby team and the SKUD 18 sailing team 
The wheelchair rugby team won its first Paralympic Games gold medal and the SKUD 18 sailing team won the first sailing gold medal since the Sydney Games in 2000.

- Awards: Team of the Year – Australian wheelchair rugby team, The Steelers, and the SKUD 18 sailing team, Daniel Fitzgibbon and Liesl Tesch.

- Events where they won a gold medal:
 Wheelchair rugby
 SKUD 18 sailing

Media coverage 
The International Paralympic Committee said that "the London Paralympic 2012 Games were watched by a cumulative international audience of 3.4 billion (excluding the host nation), which is an increase of around 37 percent on the last summer Games in Beijing".

The Australian Broadcasting Corporation (ABC) was the official Australian broadcaster.

The ABC provided over 100 hours of free to air coverage on ABC1. This coverage had a broadcast team of veteran Olympic and Paralympic athletes. ABC2 broadcast live panel programs at night. These programs aimed “to look at the lighter side of the games”. The ABC also had regular updates on News 24 and on their website, ABC online. Through this website and ABC's iView, Australians were able to access Paralympic coverage at any time.

The average number of audience viewers per day was 1.6 million people. The Australian Paralympic Team's Facebook page grew by 16,000 fans and its YouTube channel reached close to 474,000 views.

The Australian Government declared that the coverage was “the most comprehensive ever implemented by the Australian Paralympic Committee Communications division”.

Statistics show that the number of media stories about the Paralympic Games has increased each time since the 2004 Athens Summer Paralympic Games.

The number of media stories increased over time because of interest. The table below shows the increased interest by the Australian public as it shows the increasing number of viewers in millions.

Effects of the London 2012 Paralympic Games on Australian society 
The media coverage on the Paralympic Games had an effect on Australian society. The increased coverage and increased audiences showed Australia's increased interest in Paralympic sport.

Light-hearted panel shows aided this interest. For instance, Australian comedian, Adam Hills, created a show called The Last Leg. Hills hosts the show with Alex Brooker, both of whom are disabled, and with comedian Josh Widdicombe. Broadcast on the ABC in Australia and on Channel 4 in the UK, the show recapped each day's competition at the London 2012 Paralympics, engaging in feedback from the public, which “facilitated dialogue… [and encouraged the exploration of] issues of disability in an open and respectful but also playful way”.

These panel shows and high-profile Paralympic athletes are using their position for political activism. Consequently, it is argued that the media and individual Paralympic athletes have “helped change societal perspectives… [as] para-athletes are now increasingly being judged alongside other sporting peers with or without a disability”.

As such, Paralympians are now beginning to have commercial success. For instance, Paralympians Kelly Cartwright, Ahmed Kelly, Dylan Alcott, Kurt Fearnley and Evan O’Hanlon featured in Qantas’ London 2012 Ambassador Program and the airline's in-flight safety message, which ran from June 2012.

Paralympians Kurt Fearnley, Matt Cowdrey, Kelly Cartwright and Toby Kane made eleven public appearances for Telstra.

While Paralympians Dylan Alcott, Grace Bowman, Matthew Cowdrey and Jessica Gallagher appeared in the Swisse Vitamins television commercials.

On a broader level, the International Olympic Committee (IOC) and the International Paralympic Committee (IPC) suggest that the Olympics and Paralympics provide inspiration for ordinary people to get motivated to participate in sport, known as the “trickle-down effect”.

However, research by the Australian Centre for Olympic Studies refutes their statement. They argue that data from the Exercise Recreation and Sport survey shows that “no increase of participation in Olympic sports was found”, which suggests that Olympic sport does not inspire the “trickle-down effect”. However, they also note that a similar study “cannot be carried out for Paralympic sports” because Commonwealth and State departments of sport “never included a disability module”.

A report by Disability Rights Now suggests that “support for grassroots participation and pathways to elite level competition is lacking”. They argue against relying on the Australian Paralympic Committee's (APC) Talent Search Program and the APC's emphasis on elite development over grassroots participation.

However, the Australian Government argues that the Talent Search Program is successful. For the 2012 London Paralympics, 43 Paralympic athletes on the Australian team were found using this program. Of these athletes, twenty-five won a medal at the 2012 Games – ten gold, seven silver and eleven bronze – which is 32.9 per cent of Australia's total medal tally.

Also, the program has achieved better results than the previous Talent Search period, as demonstrated in the table below:

Talent Search Program table

Medalists

Events

Athletics 

Athletics team
Selected team of 43 athletes. 

Support staff – Administration -Andrew Faichney (Section Manager), Don Elgin (Section Manager), Lynda Gusbeth (Section Manager), Stephanie Martin (Personal Care Assistant), Janet Rerden; Coaches – Steve Butler, Andrew Dawes, Iryna Dvoskina, John Eden, Aaron Holt, Brett Jones, Tim Matthews, Fred Periac, Brett Robinson, Louise Sauvage; Physiotherapists – Victoria Moore, Bernadette Petzel, Soft Tissue Therapist – Mick Jordan, Phil Power; Mechanic – Andrew Carter

Australia finished 10th on the athletics medal table winning 27 medals – 5 gold, 9 silver and 13 bronze. Gold medalists were – Evan O'Hanlon (gold), Richard Colman, Kelly Cartwright and Todd Hodgetts. Russell Short attended his 7th Games, Hamish MacDonald his 6th Games and Christine Dawes and Richard Nicholson their 5th Games.

Results key

Track events – men

Track events – women

Field events – women

Field events – men

Cycling 

Selected team of 15 athletes. Kieran Modra was attending his 7th Games.

Support staff – Administration – Murray Lydeamore (Section Manager) ; Coaches – Peter Day (Head), Jenni Banks, Paul Martens, Tom Skulander ; Mechanic – Peter Giessauf, Mike Winter ; Physiotherapist – Anouska Edwards, Soft tissue therapist – Alan Downes

Equestrian 

Selected team of 4 athletes.

Support staff – Administration – Sally Francis (Section Manager) ; Coach – Julia Battams (Head) ; Physioptherapist – Victoria Kahn ; Grooms – Elsa Davis, Nicole King, Fay Mendez, Kate O'Brien ; Veterinarian – Janine Dwyer  m
Three athletes attended Games for the first time. Australia won its first gold medal since the 2000 Sydney Games with Joann Formosa's medal.

Goalball

Women's tournament

Selected Australian women's team of 6 athletes

Support staff – Administration – Peter Corr (Section Manager); Coach – Georgina Kenaghan ; Physiothyerapist – Eliza Kwan

The team went into the Games ranked eight in the world and is the first Australian goalball team to qualify for the Paralympic sport since Atlanta in 1996. It competed in Group B against China, United States, Sweden, Japan and Canada. The Australian men's team did not qualify after losing the Africa Oceania Goalball Regional Championships 5–4 against Algeria.
Group play

Powerlifting 

Selected team of 2 athletes. 
Men – Darren Gardiner and Abebe Fekadu. 
Support staff – Administration – Scott Upston (Section Manager) ; Coach – Ray Epstein

Gardiner, a previous Games medallist, competed at his fourth Games and Fekadu and a refugee from Ethiopia competed at his second Games. Australia did not win any medals.

Rowing 

Single scull – Erik Horrie 
Pair – Gavin Bellis, Kathryn Ross 
Support staff – Administration – Dean Oakman (Section Manager); Coach – Chad King (Head) ; Boat Technician – Urs Graf ; Physiotherapist – Erin Smyth 

Australia won a silver medal through Erik Horrie.

Qualification Legend: FA=Final A (medal); FB=Final B (non-medal); R=Repechage

Sailing 

Selected team of 6 athletes 

Support staff – Administration – Sarah Karsten (Section Manager), Peter Conde (Support staff) ; Coaches – Grant Alderson, Tim Lowe, Richard Scarr ; Physiotherapist – Sarah Ross, Technical Support – Adrian Finglas, Boat Technician – Jeffery Milligan ; Personal Care Attendant – Kumi Sasaki

Lisel Tesch attendedg her sixth Games but the first as sailor. She previously captained Australian women's wheelchair basketball team to medals at previous Games. Tesch won her first Paralympic gold medal in combination with Daniel Fitzgibbon to win Two Person Keelboat.

Shooting 

Selected team of 6 athletes.

Support staff – Admionistration – Nick Sullivan (Section Manager) ; Coach – Miro Sipek ; Technical Support – Stuart Smith ; Personal Care Attendant – Anne Bugden, Yvonne Cain, Margaret Zubcic

Libby Kosmala competed at her 11th Paralympic Games at the age of 70. Ashley Adams competed at his 4th Games. Australia won one bronze medal through Natalie Smith.

Swimming 

Selected team of 35 athletes.

Men's events

Legend: Q= Qualified for final; OC= Oceania Record; PR= Paralympic Record; WR= World Record

Women's events

Qualification Legend: Q= Qualified for final; OC= Oceania Record; PR= Paralympic Record; WR= World Record

Support staff – Administration – Karyn Burgess (Section Manager) ; Coaches – Brendan Keogh (Head), Angelo Basalo, Tom Davis, Michael Freney, Rob Hindmarsh, Jon O'Neil-Shaw, Chris Phillips, Bash Zidan ; Personal Care Attendant – Tara Andrews ;  Physiotherapist – David Spurrier, Jo Evershed ; Sport Scientists – Brendan Burkett, Sacha Fulton ; Soft tissue therapist – Penny Will ; Psychologist – Jason Patchell

Australia finished second on the gold medal table and won a total of 37 medals 18 gold, 7 silver and 12 bronze. Leading swimmers were – Jacqueline Freney won 8 gold medals, Matthew Cowdrey won 5 gold medals, 2 silver medals and 1 bronze medal and Ellie Cole won 4 gold medals and 2 bronze medals.

Table tennis 

Selected team of 2 athletes. 
Women- Melissa Tapper and Rebecca McDonnell.
Support staff – Administration – Roger Massie (Section Manager); Coach – Alois Rosario (Head)

Australia did not win any medals.
Women

Wheelchair basketball

Men's tournament

The Australian men's wheelchair basketball team were in Group A with the United States, Spain, South Africa, Italy and Turkey. Australia won the silver medal, losing to Canada in the final.

Group stage

Quarter-final

Semi-final

Gold medal match

Support staff – men – administration – Leigh Gooding (section manager); coaches – Ben Ettridge (head), Matteo Feriani (assistant), Thomas Kyle (assistant), physiotherapist – Jesse Adams.

Women's tournament

The Australian women's wheelchair basketball team were in Group A with the Netherlands, Great Britain, Brazil and Canada. Australia won the silver medal, losing to Germany in the final.

Group stage

Quarter-final

Semi-final

Gold medal match

Support staff – women – administration – Marian Stewart (section manager); coaches – John Triscari (head), David Gould, Ben Osborne; physiotherapist – Miranda Wallis.

Wheelchair rugby 

Selected team of 11 athletes

Six athletes made their Games debut. Greg Smith was the flag bearer for the opening ceremonies. The Australian team 'the Steelers'  went into the Games as the silver medallist from the 2008 Beijing Games and 2010 World Wheelchair Rugby Championships. Australia defeated Canada to win its first wheelchair rugby gold medal.

Group stage

Semi-finals

Gold medal match

Support staff – Administration – Paul Kiteley (Section Manager) ; Coach – Brad Dubberley (Head); Technical Support – Chevvy Cooper ; Personal Care Assistant – Angela Mansell ; Physiotherapist – Simon Mole

Wheelchair tennis 

Selected team of 4 athletes.

Support staff – Administration – Brenda Tierney (Section Manager) ; Coaches – Greg Crump (Head), Craig Purcell

Daniela Di Toro competed at her fifth Games. Australia did not win any medals.

Administration and support 
Team Executive – Jason Hellwig (Chef de Mission), Michael Hartung (Deputy Cheff de Mission), Kate McLoughlin(Deputy Chef de Mission), Adam McCarthy (Paralympic Attache), Kurt Plummer (Security Liaison Officer), Jim FitzSimons (General Counsel)

Operations - Caroline Walker (Manager, Logistics), Anna Muldoon (Cooridinator, Logistics), Chris Nunn (Manager, Coach Services), Steven Graham (Assistant, Coach Services), Greg Omay (Assistant, Coach Services), Natalie Hutchinson (Manager, Team Services), Cathy Lambert, (Cooridinator, Team Services), Chris Voysey (Manager, Information Technology), Tim Murphy (Assistant, Information Technology), Genevieve McMahon (Manager, Classification), Steve Loader(Manager, Off Airport Processing)

Media Team – Tim Mannion (Manager, Media, and Communications),Shaun Giles (Manager, Multimedia), Margie McDonald (MLO), Gennie Sheer (MLO), Lachlan Searle (MLO), Chris Abbott (MLO), David Sygall (MLO), Jacqualine Chartres (MLO), Rebekka Wake (MLO), Sarah Rogers (MLO), Darcy Bonser (Cooridinator, Multimedia), Olivia McGrath (Cooridinator, Multimedia), Neil Cross (MLO), Jeff Crow (Chief Photographer), Judy Goldman (MLO,Sydney Office)

Medical Staff - Alison Campbell (Manager, SSSM), Linda Clow (Team Doctor), Corey Cunningham (Team Doctor), Geoff Thompson (Team Doctor), Ruth Fazakerley (Nurse/Clinic Administrator), Richard Bennett (Psychologist), Sarah Jack (Psychologist), Liz Broad (Manager, Nutrition), Siobhan Moran (Assistant, Nutrition), Jo Vaile (Manager, Recovery), Matthew Driller (Assistant, Recovery), Keren Faulkner (Manager, Physical Therapies), Penny Dayan (Physiotherapist), Gilian Niven (Soft Tissue Therapist), Scott Smith (Soft Tissue Therapist), Ebonie Scase (Physiotherapist), Zoe Horder(Personal Care Attendant)

Welcome home celebrations 
The team returned to Sydney Airport to be greeted by a number of Australian Government ministers, family, friends and the media. The team was treated to a performance by the band Icehouse. Congratulatory messages were from Acting Prime Minister Wayne Swan, Minister for Sport Kate Lundy and Opposition Leader Tony Abbott.

See also
 2012 Summer Paralympics
 Australia at the Paralympics
 Australia at the 2012 Summer Olympics
 Images of Australian Team at the 2012 London Paralympics

References

External links
Australian Paralympic Committee London 2012 Paralympic Games site

Nations at the 2012 Summer Paralympics
2012
Paralympics